James Somerset ( – after 1772) was an African man and the plaintiff in a pivotal court case that confirmed that slavery was not legal in England and Wales.

Biography
Somerset was born in West Africa around 1741. He was captured when he was about 8 years old, sold to European slave traders, and transported to the Colony of Virginia where Scottish merchant Charles Stewart bought the child. In 1764, Somerset was taken to Boston, where Stewart had been appointed Receiver General of Customs.

In November 1769, Stewart moved to England, taking Somerset along to serve him in his residence in London. In London, Somerset was baptised on 10 February 1771 at the Church of St Andrew, Holborn, with Thomas Walkin, Elizabeth Cade and John Marlow acting as his godparents. Perhaps because baptism was often associated with manumission, Somerset refused to continue serving Stewart and left him. Somerset evidently lived in freedom for several months, but in November 1771 he was kidnapped and forced aboard the Ann and Mary, captained by John Knowles, to be transported to Jamaica and sold.

His godparents, abolitionists, filed a Habeas corpus case with the courts and enlisted Granville Sharp to aid Somerset. The case, Somerset v Stewart, saw powerful interests arguing on both sides, as it challenged the legal basis of slavery in England and Wales. On 22 June 1772, the judge, Lord Mansfield, found in favour of Somerset. Although Mansfield had meant for the ruling to be narrowly construed, it was popularly taken to confirm that slavery was outlawed in England and Wales. Somerset himself appears to have adopted the broader interpretation and wrote to at least one enslaved person encouraging them to desert their master.

Nothing is known of Somerset after 1772.

See also
 Jonathan Strong (slave)
 Somerset v Stewart
 Abolitionism in the United Kingdom
 Slavery in the British Isles

References

Further reading

1741 births
Year of death unknown
18th-century American slaves